Bourville is a commune in the Seine-Maritime department, region of Normandy, northern France.

Geography

Population

Places of interest
 The church of St. Martin, dating from the twelfth century.
 The seventeenth-century chateau de Tonneville.
 The seventeenth-century church at Tonneville.

Notable people
Actor Bourvil (André Raimbourg) spent all his childhood in the village and its name inspired his stage name.

See also
Communes of the Seine-Maritime department

References

Communes of Seine-Maritime